Syed Samsuddin Ahmed is a prominent academic from Bangladesh. He is the founder vice chancellor of Bangamata Sheikh Fojilatunnesa Mujib Science & Technology University (BSFMSTU). Prior to this position, Ahmed worked as a senior professor of the Department of Geology and Mining at University of Rajshahi and also served in different academic, administrative, and co-curricular development activities at the University of Rajshahi.

Early life and education
Ahmed graduated, in 1979, and earned a master's degree, in 1980, from the Department of Geology and Mining at University of Rajshahi and a PhD in 1993 from Jadavpur University.

Career
In 1983, Ahmed joined as a faculty member in the department of Geology and Mining at University of Rajshahi.  He has long-held experience in university administration including as chairman of the department of Geology and Mining at University of Rajshahi, Provost of the Madar Bux Hall, University of Rajshahi, member of Rajshahi University Senate and Syndicate, and the administrator of Rajshahi University Press. He was the director of the Barapukuria Coal Mining Company Limited, Dinajpur, Bangladesh.

Professional affiliations
 Life Member, Geological Society of Bangladesh
 Member, Bangladesh Association for the Advancement of Science
 Associate Member, Third World Academy of Science
 Life Member, National Environmental Science Academy, New Delhi, India

Research and publications
Ahmed has published 52 scientific papers, mostly in international journals.

References

Living people
Academic staff of the University of Rajshahi
Jadavpur University alumni
Vice-Chancellors of BSFMSTU
Year of birth missing (living people)